The 1935 Troy State Red Wave football team represented Troy State Teachers College (now known as Troy University) as an independent during the 1935 college football season. Led by fifth-year head coach Albert Elmore, the Red Wave compiled an overall record of 5–5.

Schedule

References

Troy State
Troy Trojans football seasons
Troy State Red Wave football